Ahmed Adam (born 24 August 1987) is a Sudanese swimmer.

He competed at the 2008 Summer Olympics in the Men's 50 metre freestyle, but did not advance.

References

External links
 

1987 births
Living people
Sudanese male swimmers
Olympic swimmers of Sudan
Swimmers at the 2008 Summer Olympics